The 1985–86 Winnipeg Jets season was the 14th season of the Winnipeg Jets, their seventh season in the National Hockey League. General Manager John Ferguson replaced coach Barry Long late in the season and guided the club on an interim basis to a 7-6-1 record. The Jets placed third in the Smythe, and despite their dismal 26-47-7 record, qualified for the playoffs only to lose to the Calgary Flames in the first round.

Offseason
After a record breaking 1984-85 season, in which the Jets posted 43-27-10 record, earning 96 points, the team had a very quiet off-season.  Winnipeg participated in the 1985 NHL Entry Draft on June 15, 1985, and with their first round pick, 18th overall, the Jets selected Ryan Stewart from the Kamloops Blazers of the WHL.  Stewart had 33 goals and 70 points in 54 games with the Blazers during the 1984-85 season.  Some other notable selections by the Jets were goaltender Daniel Berthiaume in the third round, defenseman Fredrik Olausson in the fourth round and forward Danton Cole in the sixth round.

On June 25, 1985, the Jets signed team captain Dale Hawerchuk to an eight year, $3.2 million contract.  Hawerchuk, who was the first overall draft pick by Winnipeg in the 1981 NHL Entry Draft was coming off a 53 goal and 130 point season with the club in the 1984-85 season.  The club signed undrafted free agent goaltender Pokey Reddick on September 25, 1985.  Reddick spent the 1984-85 season with the Brandon Wheat Kings, going 14-30-1 with a 5.64 GAA in 47 games.

Regular season

Final standings

Schedule and results

Playoffs
The Jets lost the Division Semi-Finals in three-straight against the Calgary Flames.

Player statistics

Regular season
Scoring

Goaltending

Playoffs
Scoring

Goaltending

Awards and records

Transactions

Trades

Free agents

Draft picks
The Jets selected the following players at the 1985 NHL Entry Draft, which was held at the Toronto Convention Centre in Toronto, Ontario on June 15, 1985.

NHL Amateur Draft

Farm teams

See also
1985–86 NHL season

References

External links

Winnipeg Jets season, 1985-86
Winnipeg Jets (1972–1996) seasons
Winn